Anfu Town was a historic town and the former county seat of Linli in Hunan, China. It was originally the Chengguan Town established in 1951, Chengguan Town was renamed to Anfu Town in 2004, and the town was reformed on November 23, 2015. Through the merging villages and communities in 2016, the town had 4 villages and 26 communities under its jurisdiction, its seat is Anfulu Community. It ceased to be a separate town and was divided into Anfu Subdistrict and Wangchenh Subdistrict in 2017.

Subdivisions (2016 - 2017)
When the town was reformed in 2015, the town had 33 villages and 11 communities. Through the amalgamation of the village-level divisions in 2016, the town were divided into 20 villages and 11 communities  soon afterwards its divisions were adjusted to 4 villages and 26 communities.

Subdivisions in 2015

References

External links
 Website (Chinese / 中文)

Linli County
Former township-level divisions of Hunan